Douglas Smith is a special effects artist who is best known as one of the people who won at the 69th Academy Awards for Best Visual Effects on the film Independence Day. He won with Volker Engel, Clay Pinney and Joe Viskocil.

Selected filmography

Winter's Tale (2014)
Percy Jackson: Sea of Monsters (2013)
Alvin and the Chipmunks: Chipwrecked (2011)
Aliens in the Attic (2009)
Alvin and the Chipmunks: The Squeakquel (2009)
Evan Almighty (2007)
Garfield: A Tail of Two Kitties (2006)
The Flintstones in Viva Rock Vegas (2000)
Flubber (1997)
Independence Day (1996)
True Lies (1994)
Spaceballs (1987)
Star Trek: The Motion Picture (1979)
Star Wars (1977)

References

External links

Living people
Best Visual Effects Academy Award winners
Special effects people
Year of birth missing (living people)